Henley Beach South is a coastal suburb of Adelaide, South Australia. It is located in the City of Charles Sturt.

Geography
Henley Beach South lies between Henley Beach Road and the River Torrens outlet. To the north, is Henley Beach and to the south is West Beach.

Demographics

The 2006 Census by the Australian Bureau of Statistics counted 2,289 persons in Henley Beach South on census night. Of these, 51.6% were male and 48.4% were female.

The majority of residents (75.5%) are of Australian birth, with a further 5.4% identifying England as their country of origin.

The age distribution of Henley Beach South residents is skewed slightly higher than the greater Australian population. 71.1% of residents were over 25 years in 2006, compared to the Australian average of 66.5%; and 28.9% were younger than 25 years, compared to the Australian average of 33.5%.

Politics

Local government
Henley Beach South is part of Henley Ward in the City of Charles Sturt local government area, being represented in that council by Jim Fitzpatrick and Robert Randall.

State and federal
Henley Beach South lies in the state electoral district of Colton and the federal electoral division of Hindmarsh. The suburb is represented in the South Australian House of Assembly by Matt Cowdrey and federally by Steve Georganas.

Community

Schools
Henley Beach Primary School is located on Hazel Terrace.

Facilities and attractions

Parks
Linear Park, lies along the River Torrens on the suburb's southern boundary. The beach of Henley Beach South extends the length of the suburb. There is also significant greenspace in the vicinity of Lexington Road.

Transportation

Roads
Henley Beach South is serviced by Henley Beach Road, connecting the suburb to Adelaide city centre. Seaview Road runs along the coast.

Public transport
Henley Beach South is serviced by public transport run by the Adelaide Metro.

From 1894 to 1957, the Grange railway line continued from its present terminus along the east side of Military Road, terminating at Main Street, Henley Beach. Tram services also serviced the suburb until 1957, running from the city along Henley Beach Road and Seaview Road to interchange with the train line.

Bicycle routes
A bicycle path extends through Linear Park.

See also
 List of Adelaide suburbs

References

External links

Suburbs of Adelaide
Beaches of South Australia